The 2012–13 Terceira Divisão season was the 63rd season of the competition and the 23rd season of recognised fourth-tier football in Portugal. It was the last edition of the competition as Campeonato Nacional de Seniores was created in 2013 to replace the Segunda Divisão and Terceira Divisão (third and fourth tier of the Portuguese football league system respectively) for the 2013–14 season.

Overview
The league was contested by 82 teams in 6 divisions of 12 teams, and 1 division of 10 teams. Série Madeira was cut from this year.

Since it was the last year of the competition a large number of clubs needed to be relegated to achieve the 80 clubs that Campeonato Nacional de Seniores has. So the best 2 of each of the Promotion Group and five of the best third's were promoted. In Série Açores, only the top two of the Promotion Group were promoted.

All other were relegated, including all of the teams in the Relegation Group and the worst 3 in the Promotion Group, and including the worst third of the Promotion Group. In Série Açores, it was the worst 2 in the Promotion Group. In total 63 teams were relegated back to the Distritais.

Terceira Divisão – Série A
Série A – Preliminary league table

Terceira Divisão - Série A Promotion Group

Terceira Divisão - Série A Relegation Group

Terceira Divisão – Série B
Série B – Preliminary League Table

Terceira Divisão - Série B Promotion Group

Terceira Divisão - Série B Relegation Group

Terceira Divisão – Série C
Série C – Preliminary league table

Terceira Divisão - Série C Promotion Group

Terceira Divisão - Série C Relegation Group

Terceira Divisão – Série D
Série D – Preliminary league table

Terceira Divisão - Série D Promotion Group

Terceira Divisão - Série D Relegation Group

Terceira Divisão – Série E
Série E – Preliminary league table

Terceira Divisão - Série E Promotion Group

Terceira Divisão - Série E Relegation Group

Terceira Divisão – Série F
Série F – Preliminary league table

Terceira Divisão - Série F Promotion Group

Terceira Divisão - Série F Relegation Group

Terceira Divisão – Série Açores
Série Açores – Preliminary league table

Terceira Divisão - Série Açores Promotion Group

Terceira Divisão - Série Açores Relegation Group

Footnotes

External links
 Portuguese Division Three - footballzz.co.uk

Portuguese Third Division seasons
Port
4